Ernie Duplechin (c. 1932 – December 24, 2020) was an American football coach and college athletics administrator. He served as the head football coach at the McNeese State University from 1979 to 1981, compiling a record of 28–6–1.  Duplechin was the athletic director at McNeese State from 1980 to 1985.

Duplechin died at the age of 88, on  December 24, 2020.

Head coaching record

College

References

Year of birth missing
1930s births
2020 deaths
American football fullbacks
Baseball catchers
Louisiana Christian Wildcats baseball players
Louisiana Christian Wildcats football players
McNeese Cowboys and Cowgirls athletic directors
McNeese Cowboys football coaches
High school football coaches in Louisiana
McNeese State University alumni
People from Basile, Louisiana
Coaches of American football from Louisiana
Players of American football from Louisiana
Baseball players from Louisiana